The following is a list of current United States Football League (USFL) team rosters:

North Division

Michigan Panthers

New Jersey Generals

Philadelphia Stars

Pittsburgh Maulers

South Division

Birmingham Stallions

Houston Gamblers

Memphis Showboats

New Orleans Breakers

United States Football League (2022) teams
United States Football League